Maharaja Sir Bhupinder Singh,  (12 October 1891 – 23 March 1938) was an Indian royal and cricket player. He was the ruling Maharaja of the princely state of Patiala in British India from 1900 to 1938. He was born in a Sidhu royal Jat Sikh family.

Biography 
Bhupinder Singh was born at the Moti Bagh Palace, Patiala and educated at Aitchison College. At age 9, he succeeded as Maharaja of Patiala state upon death of his father, Maharaja Rajinder Singh, on 9 November 1900. A Council of Regency ruled in his name until he took partial powers shortly before his 18th birthday on 1 October 1909 and was invested with full powers by the Viceroy of India, the 4th Earl of Minto, on 3 November 1910.

He served on the General Staff in France, Belgium, Italy and Palestine in the First World War as an honorary lieutenant-colonel, and was promoted honorary major general in 1918 and honorary lieutenant-general in 1931.  He represented India at the League of Nations in 1925, and was chancellor of the Indian Chamber of Princes for 10 years between 1926 and 1938, also being a representative at the Round Table Conference.  He married many times and had many children by his wives and concubines.

Maharaja Bhupinder Singh was the first man in India to own aircraft, which he bought from the United Kingdom in 1910. For his aircraft he had an airstrip at Patiala built.

He was well known for the construction of buildings with bold architectural designs in Patiala, including Kali Temple, Patiala, and Chail View Palace in the summer retreat of Kandaghat along with Chail Palace and Oak Over and Cedar Lodge in Shimla which now houses the Chief Minister of Himachal Pradesh and Punjab State Guest House respectively. He was known as a sportsman. He was also known for an exceptional collection of medals, believed to be the world's largest at the time. According to legend, Maharaja Bhupinder Singh would be driven in a motorcade of 20 Rolls-Royce cars. He had a unique monorail system built in Patiala known as Patiala State Monorail Trainways.

His then Education Minister, Pandit Makhan Lal Banerjee accompanied him to the summer capital of Chail and was also a well-known referee in cricket.

He is perhaps the most famous Maharaja of Patiala, best known for his extravagance and for being a cricketer. His cricket and polo teams – Patiala XI and Patiala Tigers – were among the best of India. He was a great patron of sports.

He was captain of the Indian cricket team that visited England in 1911, and played in 27 first-class cricket matches between 1915 and 1937. For season of 1926/27, he played as member of Marylebone Cricket Club . He donated the Ranji Trophy in honour of Kumar Shri Ranjitsinhji, Jam Sahib of Nawanagar.  He was selected as the captain of India on its first Test tour of England in 1932, but dropped out for reasons of health two weeks before departure and the Maharaja of Porbandar took over. Most of the buildings of Chail Military School were donated by Maharaja of Patiala to the government of India.

Sir Bhupinder Singh founded the State Bank of Patiala in 1917.

He served as the Chancellor of Chamber of Princes from 1926 to 1931. He worked tirelessly for his subjects' betterment and introduced many social reforms in Patiala.

His elder son, Maharaja Yadavindra Singh and younger son Raja Bhalindra Singh both played first-class cricket, Yuvraj also played in one Test for India, in 1934. Raja Bhalindra Singh, later served as President of Indian Olympic Association.

On 23 March 1938, Bhupinder Singh died.

Yuvraj Yadavindra Singh became the Maharaja on 23 March 1938.  He was to be the last Maharaja, agreeing to the incorporation of Patiala into the newly independent India on 5 May 1948, becoming Rajpramukh of the new Indian state of Patiala and East Punjab States Union.

Bhupinder Singh's grandson Captain Amarinder Singh is a politician in India and served as Chief Minister of Punjab from 2002 to 2007. Captain Amarinder was again elected as Chief Minister of Punjab in 2017.

Personal life 

Bhupinder Singh married ten times and had numerous consorts. From those unions, he sired an estimated 88 children of whom at least 53 survived him. He was the owner of the world-famous "Patiala Necklace" manufactured by the famous brand Cartier SA. His wife Maharani Bakhtawar Kaur presented Queen Mary with a magnificent necklace on behalf of the Ladies of India during the Delhi Durbar of 1911 to mark the first visit to India by any Queen Empress.

Wives and consorts 
Of his five wives, Maharani Vimala Kaur Sahiba of Patiala (1906–1992), his 3rd Dowager Maharani from Ubbewal was his favourite wife. She attended all the ceremonies with him and travelled abroad.
 Maharani Sri Bakhtawar Kaur Sahiba (1892–1960). Daughter of Sardar Gurnam Singh, Sardar Bahadur of Sangrur, OBI. Married Bhupinder Singh in 1908.
 Maharani Vimala Kaur Sahiba (original name Dhan Kaur) of Ubbewal (1906–1992). Married Maharaja Bhupinder Singh 1920. OBI.

Titles
1891–1900: Sri Yuvaraja Sahib Bhupinder Singhji
1900–1911: His Highness Farzand-i-Khas-i-Daulat-i-Inglishia, Mansur-i-Zaman, Amir ul-Umara, Maharajadhiraja Raj Rajeshwar, 108 Sri Maharaja-i-Rajgan, Maharaja Bhupinder Singh, Mahendra Bahadur, Yadu Vansha Vatans Bhatti Kul Bushan, Maharaja of Patiala
1911–1914: His Highness Farzand-i-Khas-i-Daulat-i-Inglishia, Mansur-i-Zaman, Amir ul-Umara, Maharajadhiraja Raj Rajeshwar, 108 Sri Maharaja-i-Rajgan, Maharaja Sir Bhupinder Singh, Mahendra Bahadur, Yadu Vansha Vatans Bhatti Kul Bushan, Maharaja of Patiala, GCIE
1914–1918: Lieutenant-Colonel His Highness Farzand-i-Khas-i-Daulat-i-Inglishia, Mansur-i-Zaman, Amir ul-Umara, Maharajadhiraja Raj Rajeshwar, 108 Sri Maharaja-i-Rajgan, Maharaja Sir Bhupinder Singh, Mahendra Bahadur, Yadu Vansha Vatans Bhatti Kul Bushan, Maharaja of Patiala, GCIE
1918–1921: Major-General His Highness Farzand-i-Khas-i-Daulat-i-Inglishia, Mansur-i-Zaman, Amir ul-Umara, Maharajadhiraja Raj Rajeshwar, 108 Sri Maharaja-i-Rajgan, Maharaja Sir Bhupinder Singh, Mahendra Bahadur, Yadu Vansha Vatans Bhatti Kul Bushan, Maharaja of Patiala, GCIE, GBE
1921–1922: Major-General His Highness Farzand-i-Khas-i-Daulat-i-Inglishia, Mansur-i-Zaman, Amir ul-Umara, Maharajadhiraja Raj Rajeshwar, 108 Sri Maharaja-i-Rajgan, Maharaja Sir Bhupinder Singh, Mahendra Bahadur, Yadu Vansha Vatans Bhatti Kul Bushan, Maharaja of Patiala, GCSI, GCIE, GBE
1922–1931: Major-General His Highness Farzand-i-Khas-i-Daulat-i-Inglishia, Mansur-i-Zaman, Amir ul-Umara, Maharajadhiraja Raj Rajeshwar, 108 Sri Maharaja-i-Rajgan, Maharaja Sir Bhupinder Singh, Mahendra Bahadur, Yadu Vansha Vatans Bhatti Kul Bushan, Maharaja of Patiala, GCSI, GCIE, GCVO, GBE
1931–1935: Lieutenant-General His Highness Farzand-i-Khas-i-Daulat-i-Inglishia, Mansur-i-Zaman, Amir ul-Umara, Maharajadhiraja Raj Rajeshwar, 108 Sri Maharaja-i-Rajgan, Maharaja Sir Bhupinder Singh, Mahendra Bahadur, Yadu Vansha Vatans Bhatti Kul Bushan, Maharaja of Patiala, GCSI, GCIE, GCVO, GBE
1935–1938: Lieutenant-General His Highness Farzand-i-Khas-i-Daulat-i-Inglishia, Mansur-i-Zaman, Amir ul-Umara, Maharajadhiraja Raj Rajeshwar, 108 Sri Maharaja-i-Rajgan, Maharaja Sir Bhupinder Singh, Mahendra Bahadur, Yadu Vansha Vatans Bhatti Kul Bushan, Maharaja of Patiala, GCSI, GCIE, GCVO, GBE, GCSG

Honours

(ribbon bar, as it would look today)

British
 Delhi Durbar Gold Medal – 1903
 Delhi Durbar Gold Medal – 1911
 King George V Coronation Medal – 1911
 Knight Grand Commander of the Order of the Indian Empire (GCIE) – 1911
 1914 Star
 British War Medal – 1918
 Victory Medal – 1918
 Mentioned in dispatches – 1919
 Knight Grand Cross of the Order of the British Empire (GBE) – 1918
 Knight Grand Commander of the Order of the Star of India (GCSI) – for war services, New Year Honours 1921
 Knight Grand Cross of the Royal Victorian Order (GCVO) – 1922
 King George V Silver Jubilee Medal – 1935
 King George VI Coronation Medal – 1937

Foreign
 Grand Cross of the Order of the Crown of Italy – 1918
 Grand Cordon of the Order of the Nile of Egypt – 1918
 Grand Cordon of the Order of Leopold of Belgium – 1918
 Grand Cross of the Order of the Crown of Romania – 1922
 Grand Cross of the Order of the Redeemer of Greece – 1926
 Grand Cross of the Order of Charles III of Spain – 1928
 Grand Cross of the Order of the White Lion of Czechoslovakia – 1930
 Grand Cross of the Legion d'Honneur of France – 1930 (Grand Officer – 1918)
 Grand Cross of the Order of Saints Maurice and Lazarus of Italy – 1935
 Grand Cross of the Order of St Gregory the Great of the Vatican – 1935
 Grand Cross of the Order of Dannebrog of Denmark

Other
A Unani College, namely 'Bhupinder Tibbi College' was after his name at Patiala
 The Maharaja Bhupinder Singh Punjab Sports University was named after him in recognition of his contribution to the promotion of sports.

References

External links

 Cricketarchive profile of Bhupinder Singh
The Maharja's Travel to Vienna, Austria
Maharaja of Patiala
Genealogy of the rulers of Patiala
Article in Tribune on the Myth of Bhupinder's role in building Chail

1891 births
1938 deaths
Maharajas of Patiala
Jat rulers
Indian Sikhs
Knights Grand Commander of the Order of the Star of India
Knights Grand Commander of the Order of the Indian Empire
Indian Knights Grand Cross of the Royal Victorian Order
Indian Knights Grand Cross of the Order of the British Empire
Grand Crosses of the Order of the White Lion
Grand Crosses of the Order of the Dannebrog
Grand Croix of the Légion d'honneur
Knights Grand Cross of the Order of Saints Maurice and Lazarus
Knights Grand Cross of the Order of St Gregory the Great
Grand Crosses of the Order of the Crown (Romania)
Aitchison College alumni
Southern Punjab cricketers
Indian cricket administrators
Indian cricketers
Marylebone Cricket Club cricketers
Members of the first Indian cricket team to tour England in 1911
Northern India cricketers
Patiala cricketers
Punjabi people
Sikh monarchs
Indian sports executives and administrators